The Manti–La Sal National Forest covers more than  and is located in the central and southeastern parts of the U.S. state of Utah and the extreme western part of Colorado. The forest is headquartered in Price, with ranger district offices in Price, Ferron, Ephraim, Moab and Monticello. The La Sal Mountains are the second highest mountain range in Utah after the Uintas. Parts of the forest are included in the Bears Ears National Monument.

Location and history
The La Sal Mountain loop road leads from Castle Valley to Geyser Pass and back down to Moab. Scenic Oowah Lake can be found within the forest.

In descending order of land area, the forest is located in parts of San Juan, Sanpete, Emery, Utah, Grand, Carbon, and Sevier counties in Utah, as well as Montrose, and Mesa counties in Colorado (Only about 2.1% of the forest lies in Colorado). Forest headquarters is located in Price, Utah. District offices are located in Ephraim, Ferron, Moab, Monticello, and Price.

On July 1, 1915 Nebo National Forest was added, and La Sal National Forest on November 11, 1949. On August 28, 1950, the name became Manti–La Sal National Forest.

On December 28, 2016, President Barack Obama proclaimed the 1.35 million acre Bears Ears National Monument, which includes most of the Monticello Ranger District on the forest and the Dark Canyon Wilderness.

Recreation
Manti La Sal National Forest is very popular for recreation. The northern district on the Wasatch Plateau is well known for the Skyline Drive, an unpaved road tracing along the backbone of the plateau. There is also an extensive ATV trail system in the forest there. The Moab District in the La Sal Mountains contains a number of hiking trails, as well as views over the desert regions of Canyonlands National Park and Arches National Park. The Monticello District is home the Manti La Sal National Forest's only wilderness area, the Dark Canyon Wilderness, a vast, remote canyon area.
The Manti–La Sal National Forest, a 1.4 million acre mountain range, occupies parts of central and southeastern Utah, as well as parts of Colorado. The La Sal Mountains are lush with lakes, pine, aspen and evergreen trees, wildlife, and recreation. An easy drive from Moab, the La Sal Mountains not only provide a stunning visual contrast to the red rock town, but also a climactic, and recreational contrast as well.

See also
 List of U.S. national forests
 Dark Canyon Wilderness
 Trail Mountain Fire

References

External links

 Manti La Sal National Forest